Practical Boat Owner is a British magazine about boats. It is published by Future plc. It is a magazine that includes boat maintenance and repairing from baking bread on your boat to replacing your sprayhood windows. Also includes the latest news of sailing and motor boats from around the world.

History
Practical Boat Owner was started in 1967. The founding editor was Denny Desoutter. In 2002, it was announced that Sarah Norbury would become editor. She was later replaced by David Pugh. From 2018, the magazine was edited by Robert Melotti, and then Alison Wood. The current editor is Katy Stickland, who prior to the appointment was the deputy editor of Yachting Monthly magazine.

Publications
The magazine also produced a small crafts almanac as well as a glossary of nautical terms, both published by Bloomsbury.

References

External links

Floating Tiki Bar Boat Ride Adventure

Boating magazines
Sailing magazines
English-language magazines
1967 establishments in the United Kingdom
Monthly magazines published in the United Kingdom
Sports magazines published in the United Kingdom
Magazines established in 1967
Watercraft